Regis High School is a private, all-male, Jesuit, secondary school for Roman Catholic boys located on the Upper East Side of the Manhattan borough of New York City, New York.

Regis is consistently ranked among the best and most prestigious high schools in the United States. In 2017, Regis was ranked as the top Catholic high school in the U.S. by Town and Country
Magazine., and is regularly ranked as the top Catholic high school in the United States by Niche.

History
Regis High School was founded in 1914, through the financial bequest of a single (originally anonymous) benefactress, Julia M. Grant, the widow of New York City mayor Hugh J. Grant. She stipulated that her gift be used to build a Jesuit high school providing a free education for Catholic boys with special consideration given to those who could not otherwise afford a Catholic education. The school continues that policy and does not charge tuition.  

The Grants' former home is the residence of the Permanent Observer of the Holy See to the United Nations, where the pope stays when he visits New York City.

Following the death of her husband in 1910, Julia Grant met with Father David W. Hearn, S.J. and, with a stipulation of strict anonymity, gave him an envelope with the money needed to start a school to educate Catholic boys. After Mrs. Grant died, her children took over the funding of the school. The last surviving member of the family, Lucie Mackey Grant, a daughter-in-law of Julia Grant, died in 2007.

Since the 1960s, Regis has relied primarily on the Grant endowments and alumni donations to keep the school tuition-free. Following Lucie Mackey Grant's death, at an auction of her estate, Regis bid successfully for the original golden chalice used during Mass when the school was founded in 1914.

The school building was designed by Maginnis & Walsh.

In popular culture
Television shows and film have used Regis High School as a setting. Shows include: Law & Order: Criminal Intent, The Ordained, and The Good Wife.

"Tru Love", a Season 6 episode of Law & Order: Criminal Intent was also directed by Norberto Barba, a graduate of Regis.

The films Prince of the City (1981), Finding Forrester (2001), Remember Me (2010), and Straight Outta Tompkins (2013) feature scenes filmed in classrooms, hallways, and offices of Regis.

Lady Gaga was a member of the Regis Repertory during her high school years at the Convent of the Sacred Heart.

Administration
In April 2021, the school announced that it was firing its president, Fr. Daniel Lahart, after an investigation confirmed that he had engaged in "inappropriate and unwelcome verbal communications and physical conduct, all of a sexual nature, with adult members of the Regis community, including subordinates".

Extracurricular activities
The Owl, the school's newspaper, interviewed Central Intelligence Agency leak case prosecutor and alumnus Patrick J. Fitzgerald in 2006. Its article was linked on the Drudge Report and quoted by the Associated Press.

The Regis Speech and Debate Society, also known as the Hearn Society, is ranked first nationally by the National Speech and Debate Association as of September 2022.

The Regis Repertory has performed plays and musicals since their first show in 1918. They collaborate with female students attending neighboring schools such as Marymount School and Dominican Academy to perform one play and one musical every year.

Athletics 

Regis is home to teams in Basketball, Baseball, Soccer, Volleyball, Golf, Ultimate Frisbee, and track and field. Given the location of the school, many of their events take place on Randall's Island.

The biggest event every year is a triple-header set of basketball games against their rival, Xavier High School, in which the freshman, JV, and Varsity teams play back to back.

Building 
Located on 85th street between Park Avenue and Madison Avenue, Regis's building was partially completed in 1914. Construction on the three story high, 1700 seat auditorium was delayed due to World War I preventing the import of the desired Italian marble to be used. It was eventually completed the next year.

In the late 1970s, the stone owl over the south door, popular with students and alumni at the time, disappeared. In 1980, the assistant headmaster found the culprit who stole the owl and privately met up with them to have it returned. It now resides in the Regis Archive, and four owls were placed in the quadrangle to commemorate its return.

REACH 
In 2002, Regis High School created the REACH (Recruiting Excellence in Academics for Catholic High Schools) Program. Every year they select around 40 Catholic black or Hispanic fifth graders from under-served communities in the tristate area to participate in a rigorous academic bootcamp throughout middle school, including summer school and Saturday classes throughout the school-year. 

Their mission statement reads "REACH, through a transformative middle school program, empowers high-achieving young men from under-served communities as Catholic leaders committed to faith, scholarship, and service."

In 2022, more than $3.5 million dollars in scholarships were awarded to members of the REACH program.

Notable alumni

See also
 List of Jesuit sites
 List of New York City Designated Landmarks in Manhattan from 59th to 110th Streets

Notes

References

Sources
 Andreassi, Anthony (2014). Teach Me to Be Generous: The First Century of Regis High School in New York City. "Excerpt". 
 Peterson's Private Secondary Schools 2008. (Peterson's: Lawrenceville, New Jersey, 2007), p. 485. Retrieved September 7, 2010.

External links

The Hearn Fund at Regis High School

1914 establishments in New York City
Boys' schools in New York City
Educational institutions established in 1914
Jesuit high schools in the United States

New York City Designated Landmarks in Manhattan

Roman Catholic secondary schools in Manhattan
Upper East Side